Parnaoz Lukich Chikviladze (14 April 1941 – 14 June 1966) was a Georgian judoka, who won a bronze medal in the heavyweight division (+80 kg) at the 1964 Summer Olympics. At the European Championships he won a gold medal in 1965 and silver medals in 1964, 1965 and 1966. In 1964 he also was European champion in the team event. He died in a car accident in Moscow in 1966 and thus never competed in the Soviet judo championships, which were first conducted in 1973.

References

External links

 

1941 births
1966 deaths
Male judoka from Georgia (country)
Soviet male judoka
Judoka at the 1964 Summer Olympics
Olympic judoka of the Soviet Union
Olympic bronze medalists for the Soviet Union
Olympic medalists in judo
Road incident deaths in the Soviet Union
Medalists at the 1964 Summer Olympics